Veer Pratap Singh is an Indian cricketer who plays first-class cricket for Bihar.  He previously played for Cricket Association of Bengal. He is a right-arm medium seam bowler. He was also a member of the Kolkata Knight Riders in Indian Premier League. He was born at Bihar Sharif in Bihar.

References

Living people
1992 births
Indian cricketers
Bengal cricketers
Cricketers from Bihar
People from Nalanda
Deccan Chargers cricketers
Kolkata Knight Riders cricketers